Antonio Pierfederici (18 March 1919 – 6 January 1999) was an Italian actor and voice actor.

Life and career 
Born in La Maddalena, Pierfederici graduated in law and then he enrolled at the Silvio d’Amico Academy of Dramatic Arts. He started his acting career in 1943 and was mainly active on stage, getting his first personal critical success with his performance in Luchino Visconti's I parenti terribili. One of the favorite actors of Visconti, he also worked on stage with Giorgio Strehler and Orazio Costa, among others.

Filmography

References

External links 

 

1919 births
1999 deaths
Italian male film actors
Italian male television actors
Italian male stage actors
People from La Maddalena
20th-century Italian male actors
Accademia Nazionale di Arte Drammatica Silvio D'Amico alumni